Karpilovka is a rural locality (a selo) in Bolsheromanovsky Selsoviet, Tabunsky District, Altai Krai, Russia. The population was 26 as of 2013. There are 2 streets.

Geography 
Karpilovka is located 28 km northeast of Tabuny (the district's administrative centre) by road. Kanna is the nearest rural locality.

References 

Rural localities in Tabunsky District